egaming review  and EGRmagazine.com are related online gambling publishing brands covering online gambling industry news and regulation topics.

History and profile
egaming Review, (EGR Global) is the world’s leading B2B publisher and membership networking group for the online gaming and gambling industry, featuring consistent exclusive news, interviews and expert comment from the most influential people in the sector. The publisher is a part of With Intelligence and is headquartered in London.

The EGR website features up-to-the-minute coverage of breaking news, analysis and opinion from across the egaming industry. And as publisher of the industry’s only monthly B2B title and quarterly report for North America, EGR is also able to offer its readers more up-to-date insight on the big issues than any other egaming business publication.

EGR Global is also responsible for the annual Power 50 list of the top fifty most influential internet gaming companies, hosts the EGR Live event and presents the annual EGR Awards to gaming operators that it judges excel in their respective fields.

eGaming Review and EGRmagazine.com are owned by Pageant Gaming Media Limited along with four other sister brands— EGR North America, Marketing, Compliance and Technology.

References

External links
Official site

Business magazines published in the United Kingdom
Monthly magazines published in the United Kingdom
Game magazines
Gambling magazines
Magazines published in London
Magazines with year of establishment missing